Leonard Hales (1872–1914) was an English footballer who played in the Football League for Stoke.

Career
Hales began his career with his home town club Crewe Alexandra before joining Stoke in 1898. He made just one appearance before returning to Crewe. He spent two years at the Alex before trying his luck again with Stoke and he had a far more successful time scoring 4 goals in 19 matches.

Career statistics

References

English footballers
Stoke City F.C. players
Crewe Alexandra F.C. players
English Football League players
1872 births
1914 deaths
Association football forwards